Kyle Ward may refer to:

 Kyle Ward (American football) (born 1984), American football cornerback
 Kyle Ward (musician), musician for the In the Groove series of video games